Channels Television is a Nigerian independent 24-hour news and media television channel based in Lagos, Nigeria. The parent company, Channels Incorporated,  was founded in 1992, a year before the Nigerian government deregulated the broadcast media. It began broadcasting in 1995. Its primary focus is producing news and current affairs programs on Nigerian domestic issues. The Channel's mission is to act as a watchdog on governmental policies and activities.

History

Channels Television was founded in 1995 as a private television station with only 15 employees by Nigerian veteran broadcaster and entrepreneur John Momoh and Sola Momoh, also a broadcaster. The company commenced operations in Lagos, south western Nigeria and has since grown to include three other stations in Abuja, Edo and Kano states. It also has bureaus in almost every state in Nigeria, including stringers and affiliates in other parts in Africa, as well as strong relationships with international media organizations which allows access to information around the world. 
 
The channel was licensed in June 1993 and allocated a frequency on UHF (Channel 39). It began transmission two years later under the name, "Channels Television", and the first terrestrial broadcast was on the 1st of July 1995, with John Momoh reading the first news bulletin. Channels TV currently broadcasts to an audience of over 20 million people.

2008 closure

In September 2008, Channels Television was shut down by President Yar'Adua, who sent Nigeria's State Security Service (SSS) to shut down the station and to arrest its senior staff due to channel's report of Yar'Adua's bad health. The report by Channels Television was attributed to information received from News Agency of Nigeria (NAN). However, after the investigation, NAN announced that the channel did not issue any statement regarding the President stepping down, but instead, its computer was hacked into. In protest, Channels TV discontinued its use of the NAN wire service up to this date. It was proven that the e-mail received by Channels TV was a hoax sent from a computer in the Ivory Coast. Nigeria's Minister of Information, John Odey, gave the statement to the BBC emphasizing the government was angered by the report.

Production

Channels Television's team has produced feature programs, which have received commendation throughout the country. Video footage of events and happenings in Nigeria, shot by the Channels Television news crews have been used widely by broadcast organizations such as BBC, CNN and ITN. Its flagship program, "News at Ten", is considered as the most popular and most watched news in Nigeria.

Since 2009, Channels Television organizes and hosts "Channels National Kids Cup", a sport event for school children from sixteen Nigerian states held in Teslim Balogun Stadium in Lagos. General Manager of Channels Television, Steve Judo, stated that Channels Television is socially responsible media and as such chose to engage in the development of football from the roots.

2012 Nigerian bombing

In January 2012, journalist Enenche Akogwu, who worked as a correspondent in Kano for Channels Television, was shot and killed while reporting on coordinated attacks there claimed by the radical Islamist sect known as Boko Haram. According to his colleagues, Akogwu had shown up after a bombing and began filming a crowd gathered there without knowing they were armed sect members.

Awards and recognition
Named "Best Station of the Year" twelve times (2000, 2001, 2003, 2004, 2008, 2010, 2011, 2012, 2013, 2014, 2015 & 2016)  by The Federal Republic of Nigeria's Media Merit Award Trust
2013: Awarded "Best TV Station in Africa" by African Achievers Awards, Achievers Media
2013: Named "Most Compliant Television Station In Media Category" by Advertising Practitioners Council of Nigeria
2013: Awarded Lagos State Ministry of Education's "Jam Feast" award for its contribution towards youth invention and educational development
2013: "Best Report On Maternal Health" by the Society of Gynaecology And Obstetrics Of Nigeria (Sogon)
2013: Customer Service Excellence Award in Media

Partnership
On 22 March 2014, Tezuka Productions partnership with Channels TV to broadcast 8 episode spin-off series of Astro Boy, Little Astro Boy, which was aimed for preschoolers on Channels TV's children's block.

On Friday, 14 August 2015, Deutsche Welle said it had signed a partnership  agreement with "Channels TV" to demonstrates the long tradition of airing a positive view of Africa. 
Peter Limbourg, the Director-General of Deutsche Welle describe Channels TV as a great television station and a perfect partner for Deutsche Welle. Limbourg said "We at Deutsche Welle think that we have to report the great things that happen in Africa, especially in Nigeria.

John Momoh, the Chief Executive Officer of Channels TV described the partnership as "Made from heaven". 
He said, "This is part of our strategy to tell the African story, especially that of Nigeria, from the African perspective so that we do not leave this key element of definition of who we are, what we do and why, to other people to tell on our behalf".

In August 2015, Channels TV signed a memorandum of understanding with the United Nations on News coverage. The United Nation was represented by Ban Ki-moon, the Secretary-General of the United Nation.

Programs

See also

 List of television stations in Nigeria
 List of news channels
 List of television networks by country

References

External links
 

Television stations in Nigeria
Television channels and stations established in 1993
Television stations in Lagos
Television production companies of Nigeria
Companies based in Lagos
24-hour television news channels in the United Kingdom